Henry & Verlin is a 1994 Canadian film directed by Gary Ledbetter and starring Gary Farmer, Keegan MacIntosh, and Margot Kidder.

Plot
Set during the Great Depression, the film centers on an unlikely friendship that forms between Henry (Gary Farmer), an autistic adult with a childlike spirit, and his nine-year-old nephew Verlin (Keegan MacIntosh), who is also autistic. Henry helps Verlin to come out of his shell, but Verlin's mother mistrusts him, believing him to be dangerous. Henry's family eventually decides to institutionalize him and Verlin sinks back into himself at the sudden loss of his friend.

Cast
 Gary Farmer as Henry
 Keegan MacIntosh as Verlin
 Nancy Beatty as Minnie
 Robert Joy as Ferris
 Joan Orenstein as Agnes
 Eric Peterson as Lovejoy
 Margot Kidder as Mabel
 David Cronenberg as "Doc" Fisher
 Wilfrid Bray as Elvin
 Neil Dainard as Noel Winetree
 J. Winston Carroll as Reverend Rutherford
 Diana Belshaw as Judith
 Norma Edwards as Lydia
 Deborah Lobba as Matilida
 Nadine Rabinovitch as Hilda

Accolades
The film was nominated for four awards at the 15th Genie Awards: Gary Farmer for Best Actor, Nancy Beatty for Best Actress, Paul Van der Linden for Best Achievement in Cinematography, and Mark Korven for Best Music Score.

References

External links

1994 films
English-language Canadian films
1990s English-language films
Films about autism
Films scored by Mark Korven
Great Depression films
Canadian drama films
1990s Canadian films